Camelia Potec (born 19 February 1982, in Brăila) is a female Romanian swimmer, who won the gold medal in the women's 200 m freestyle at the 2004 Summer Olympics.

She won the Mare Nostrum in 2004.

References
 Her personal site 

1982 births
Living people
Olympic swimmers of Romania
Sportspeople from Brăila
Swimmers at the 2000 Summer Olympics
Swimmers at the 2004 Summer Olympics
Swimmers at the 2008 Summer Olympics
Swimmers at the 2012 Summer Olympics
Olympic gold medalists for Romania
Romanian female freestyle swimmers
World Aquatics Championships medalists in swimming
Medalists at the FINA World Swimming Championships (25 m)
European Aquatics Championships medalists in swimming
Medalists at the 2004 Summer Olympics
Olympic gold medalists in swimming
Universiade medalists in swimming
Universiade gold medalists for Romania
Universiade bronze medalists for Romania
Medalists at the 2001 Summer Universiade
Medalists at the 2005 Summer Universiade